Carl Hansen (born January 25, 1976 in Houston, Texas) is a former American football defensive end in the National Football League for the New York Jets.  He played college football at Stanford University and was drafted in the sixth round of the 1998 NFL Draft by the Seattle Seahawks. On June 6th Hansen was signed by the Seahawks only to be dropped and placed on the practice squad prior to the start of the 1998 season. The New York Jets then signed Hansen to their active roster and he played in five games his rookie season. In 2001 Hansen played for the San Francisco Demons of the XFL.

References

1976 births
Living people
American football defensive linemen
Stanford Cardinal football players
New York Jets players